Duane Dyer, better known by his stage name, Iceberg Slimm (born 1978) is a Black British rapper and founder of Frojak Entertainment who is best known for his singles "Nursery Rhymes", "Bad Boy" and "Starship" taken from his debut album, Da World on Ice. He also featured on Raghav's single, "Can't Get Enough" which charted at No. 10 in the UK Singles Chart.

Discography

Albums
2004: Da World on Ice
2012: Higher (promotional use only)

Singles
"Nursery Rhymes" (2000) (UK No. 37)
"Badboy" (2002)
"Shut U Down" (2002)
"Reminisce with Me" (2003)
"Freedom of Speech" (2003)
"Gutter" (2004)
"Falling in Love" (2004)
"U Don't Want Beef" (2004)
"Cant Get Enough" (2004) (UK No. 10) (as featured artist)
"Starship" (2004) (UK No. 73)
"Lonely (Da Break Up Song)" (featuring Raghav and D'Vinci) (2007)
"Shake Dat Thing" (2007)
"Where I'm From" (2007)
"I Have a Dream" (2008)

References

External links
Official website
Frojak.com
Twoms.com
Thesituation.co.uk

1978 births
Living people
Black British male rappers
English male rappers
Rappers from London
People from Hackney Central